Hyperolius hypsiphonus is a species of frog in the family Hyperoliidae. It is found in southern Cameroon, Gabon, Equatorial Guinea, the western Republic of the Congo, and northwestern Angola. Common name cross-banded egg-guarding frog has been proposed for it.

Description
The body is slender while the head is broad with a short snout. The eyes are large. The tympanum is distinct. The finger and toe tips are enlarged into large discs; the webbing is well-developed in both hands and feet. Dorsal skin is granular and has a lichen-like pattern that grayish during the day and dark brown at night. There are numerous black dots and three irregular, black-bordered transverse bands that are reddish brown or have the same color as the dorsum in general. The belly is transparent whitish to turquoise.

Habitat and conservation
This species lives near rivers in rainforest habitats at elevations below . The eggs are laid on leaves above small ponds to which the tadpoles eventually fall.

Hyperolius hypsiphonus is common in suitable habitat, but it is threatened by habitat loss. It is present in the Lopé National Park in Gabon, and probably in some other protected areas too.

References

hypsiphonus
Frogs of Africa
Amphibians of Angola
Amphibians of Cameroon
Amphibians of Equatorial Guinea
Amphibians of Gabon
Amphibians of the Republic of the Congo
Amphibians described in 2000
Taxa named by Jean-Louis Amiet
Taxonomy articles created by Polbot